Trigonostemon rufescens is a species of plant in the family Euphorbiaceae. It is endemic to Peninsular Malaysia.

References

Crotonoideae
Endemic flora of Peninsular Malaysia
Conservation dependent plants
Near threatened flora of Asia
Taxonomy articles created by Polbot